The Nannie Gresham Biscoe House is a historic house located at 227 Cherry Street in Arkadelphia, Arkansas.

Description and history 
Built in 1901, the two-story wood-framed house is a fine local example of Queen Anne styling, which has been passed from mother to daughter within the same family. The house was built by the widowed Nannie Gresham Biscoe as a family home and boarding house, offering residential spaces to students attending the nearby Ouachita Baptist College, where she also taught. The house is the least-altered of several period houses on the street.

The house was listed on the National Register of Historic Places on January 21, 2004.

See also
National Register of Historic Places listings in Clark County, Arkansas

References

Houses on the National Register of Historic Places in Arkansas
Queen Anne architecture in Arkansas
Houses completed in 1901
Houses in Arkadelphia, Arkansas
National Register of Historic Places in Clark County, Arkansas